Datil National Forest was a United States National Forest established in western New Mexico by the U.S. Forest Service in 1908. It was merged into another and ceased in 1931.

History
Datil National Forest was formed from the part of the also new Gila National Forest and other public lands. The Magdalena National Forest and other areas were added in 1909. 

The entire Datil National Forest lands were transferred to the jurisdictions of the Cibola National Forest (primarily) and Gila National Forest in 1931.  The name was discontinued.

Present day
The former Datil Forest area is part of the Magdalena Ranger District of the Cibola National Forest. It is located in the Datil Mountains, to the north of the town of Datil, in Catron and Socoro Counties.

See also
Mogollon-Datil volcanic field — large silicic volcanic field in western New Mexico around the town of Datil and Mogollon Mountains area.
Datil-Mogollon Section — a physiographic subdivision of the Colorado Plateau Province in the Datil Mountains—Mogollon Mountains region.
Forest History Society — and 'Foresthistory.org' external links below.

References

External links
Cibola National Forest: official Magdalena Ranger District website
Foresthistory.org: the Forest History Society homepage
Foresthistory.org: Listing of the National Forests of the United States and Their Dates — Text from "Encyclopedia of American Forest and Conservation History"; Davis, Richard C., ed.; New York: Macmillan Publishing Company; 1983; Vol. II, pp. 743-788.

Former National Forests of New Mexico
Protected areas of Catron County, New Mexico
Protected areas of Socorro County, New Mexico
Cibola National Forest
Protected areas established in 1908
1908 establishments in New Mexico Territory
1931 disestablishments in New Mexico
Protected areas disestablished in 1931